Indiana's 12th congressional district was a congressional district for the United States House of Representatives in Indiana.  It was eliminated as a result of the 1940 Census. It was last represented by Louis Ludlow who was redistricted into the 11th District.

List of members representing the district

References 

 Congressional Biographical Directory of the United States 1774–present

12
Former congressional districts of the United States
1875 establishments in Indiana
1943 disestablishments in Indiana
Constituencies established in 1875
Constituencies disestablished in 1943